This is a list of the National Register of Historic Places listings in Glacier County, Montana.  It is intended to be a complete list of the properties and districts on the National Register of Historic Places in Glacier County, Montana, United States.  The locations of National Register properties and districts for which the latitude and longitude coordinates are included below, may be seen in a map.

There are 39 properties and districts listed on the National Register in the county, including 3 National Historic Landmarks.

Listings county-wide

|}

See also

 List of National Historic Landmarks in Montana
 National Register of Historic Places listings in Montana
 National Register of Historic Places listings in Glacier National Park

References

Glacier